Sierra del Toro is a  long mountain range in the Alt Palància comarca, Valencian Community, close to the limit with Teruel Province, Aragon, Spain. It is named after the nearby town of El Toro.

Location
This mountain range is located at the eastern end of the Iberian System and is a southern prolongation of the Sierra de Javalambre. Its highest point is Puntal del Agrillar (1,616 m). Other important peaks are Puntal de Magaña (1,614 metres), Alto del Tomatero (1,607 metres), Puntal de Peiró (1,605 metres) and Salada (1,581 metres), where there is a military communications compound.
Its summits are usually covered in snow in the winter and are among the highest peaks of the Land of Valencia. Therefore, there are also numerous ancient ice houses.

These mountains have been often devastated by forest fires in hot and dry summers and extensive planting of trees has been undertaken.

This mountain range was the scenario of violent battles during the Spanish Civil War (1936–1939) when the fascist troops tried to split the Spanish Republican government territory in two and reach the Mediterranean coast and there are many remains of trenches.

See also
Mountains of the Valencian Community
XYZ Line

References

External links

enciclopedia.cat - Javalambre

Toro
Toro
Alto Palancia
Toro